Magnolia griffithii is a species of plant in the family Magnoliaceae. It is found in India and Myanmar.

References

griffithii
Data deficient plants
Taxonomy articles created by Polbot